Bahamas Hotel, Catering and Allied Workers Union is a trade union organizing employees in the tourism sector in The Bahamas.

Leadership:
President: Darrin Woods
1st Vice President:
General Secretary:

The union is affiliated to IUF.

References

Trade unions in the Bahamas
Hospitality industry trade unions